George Wood (born 20 December 1999) is a British male acrobatic gymnast. With partners Connor Bartlett, Gareth Wood and Daniel Cook, Wood achieved silver in the 2014 Acrobatic Gymnastics World Championships.

References

1999 births
Living people
British acrobatic gymnasts
Male acrobatic gymnasts
Medalists at the Acrobatic Gymnastics World Championships
21st-century British people